The Shaanxi KQ-200 is a four-engined, turboprop anti-submarine and maritime surveillance aircraft used by the Chinese People's Liberation Army Navy. It was built by Shaanxi Aircraft Corporation and is based on the Y-9 airframe featuring WJ-6C turboprops with 6-blade each.

The first two prototypes were first seen at the SAC factory airfield in November 2011 and mass production is believed to have begun in 2015. It features a completely pressurised cabin, a bulbous radome which house a search radar and a distinctive magnetic anomaly detector (MAD). An additional electro-optical turret housing a forward-looking infrared (FLIR) camera, CCD/TV camera and laser rangefinder is fitted underneath the forward fuselage. It also has four opening to deploy sonobuoys (SQ-4 and SQ-5) and cargo bay to carry anti-submarine grenades and torpedoes.

Operators
 People's Republic of China
 People's Liberation Army Naval Air Force - 20+

Specifications

See also

References

Military aircraft
Anti-submarine aircraft